The FIBA Oceania Championship for Men 2007 was the qualifying tournament of FIBA Oceania for the men's basketball tournament at the 2008 Summer Olympics at Beijing. The tournament, a best-of-three series between Australia and New Zealand, was held in Melbourne, Sydney and Brisbane. Australia won the first two games to qualify for the Olympics, while New Zealand won the third game and took part in the FIBA wildcard tournament.

Venues

Teams that did not enter

Results

External links
 Official website

FIBA Oceania Championship
Championship
2007 in New Zealand basketball
2007–08 in Australian basketball
International basketball competitions hosted by Australia
Australia men's national basketball team games
New Zealand men's national basketball team games